Suvari or Süvari ("cavalry", from Persian Sawār) is a Turkish or Estonian surname. As a Turkish surname it means "cavalry soldier".

It may refer to: 

 Adnan Suvari (1926-1991), Turkish football coach
 Mena Suvari, American actress

See also
 Sowar

References

Turkish-language surnames